Paul A. Bell (October 3, 1950 – June 7, 2010) was an American politician who served as Iowa State Representative from the 57th and 41st Districts. He served in the Iowa House of Representatives from the 57th District (1993 - 2003) and the 41st District from 2003 and until his death in June 2010.  He received his BA from the University of Northern Iowa.

Bell served on several committees in the Iowa House—the Ethics committee; the Public Safety committee; the Transportation committee; the Veterans Affairs committee; and the Natural Resources committee, where he was chair.  He also served on the Agriculture and Natural Resources Appropriations Subcommittee.

Bell was re-elected in 2006 with 7,303 votes (63%), defeating Republican opponent Adam Vandall.

Bell died at the Skiff Medical Center in Newton, Iowa on June 7, 2010, after a year-long battle with stomach cancer.

References

External links
Representative Paul A. Bell official Iowa General Assembly site
Paul Bell State Representative official constituency site
 

1950 births
2010 deaths
People from Algona, Iowa
People from Newton, Iowa
University of Northern Iowa alumni
American municipal police officers
Democratic Party members of the Iowa House of Representatives
Deaths from stomach cancer
Deaths from cancer in Iowa